Richard Ballon Goldbloom,  (December 16, 1924 – November 18, 2021) was a Canadian pediatrician, university professor, and the fifth chancellor of Dalhousie University. Born in Montreal, Quebec, he was educated at Selwyn House School and Lower Canada College. He received a Bachelor of Science degree in 1945 and a Doctor of Medicine degree in 1949 from McGill University. He did his post-graduate medical education at the Royal Victoria Hospital, the Montreal Children's Hospital and the Children's Hospital Boston.
From 1964 to 1967, he was an associate professor at McGill University and a physician at the Montreal Children's Hospital. From 1967 to 1985, he was the head of Dalhousie University's Department of Pediatrics. He was the first physician-in-chief and director of research at the Izaak Walton Killam Hospital for Children in Halifax, Nova Scotia.

In 1975 he became the founding president of the Halifax-Dartmouth Waterfront Development Corp., a federal and provincial agency that worked towards restoration and development of the area's waterfront,  until 1980, when he was unexplainably removed by the Nova Scotia government. A classical pianist, Goldbloom was the president of the Atlantic Symphony Orchestra in the 1970s. From 1983 to 1985, he was Chairman of the Rhodes Scholar Selection Committee and since 1989 he has been the Chairman of the Maritimes Rhodes Scholar Selection Committee.

On December 29, 1986, was appointed an Officer of the Order of Canada. He was invested into the order on April 29, 1987 for 

He was also the younger brother of former Canadian Commissioner of Official Languages, and Companion of the Order of Canada, Victor Goldbloom. He was married to fellow Order of Canada recipient Ruth Goldbloom (née Schwartz) from 1946 until her death in 2012. They had three children. Their oldest son, Alan Goldbloom, was the former C.O.O. of Toronto's Hospital for Sick Children and is retired as the President and CEO of Children's Hospitals and Clinics of Minnesota. Their daughter, Barbara Goldbloom-Hughes, is an education consultant in Burlington, Ontario. Their youngest son, David Goldbloom, is the former Physician-in-Chief at Toronto's Centre for Addiction and Mental Health (CAMH). He now serves as Senior Medical Adviser to the CAMH, as well as Chair of the Mental Health Commission of Canada.

Goldbloom died on November 18, 2021, in Halifax, at the age of 96 – about three weeks short of his 97th birthday.


See also
List of Canadian university leaders

References

Notes

Further reading
 Richard B. Goldbloom: A Lucky Life. Formac 2013

1924 births
2021 deaths
Anglophone Quebec people
Canadian pediatricians
Canadian university and college chancellors
Academic staff of the Dalhousie University
Jewish Canadian writers
McGill University Faculty of Medicine alumni
Academic staff of McGill University
Members of the Order of Nova Scotia
Officers of the Order of Canada
Writers from Montreal